The St. Paul's Conversion Church is a religious building belonging to the Catholic Church located in the town of Windwardside on the Caribbean island of Saba, a dependent territory with the status of special municipality of the Kingdom of the Netherlands. It is one of three Catholic Churches on the island, along with Sacred Heart Church and Holy Rosary Church.

History
The church was constructed of stone between 1859 and 1860 under the supervision of Fr. Manuel Romero from Venezuela, making it the oldest Catholic Church on the island.

Gallery

References

External links
Official Facebook

Roman Catholic churches in Saba
Buildings and structures in Saba
Roman Catholic churches completed in 1860
19th-century Roman Catholic church buildings in the Netherlands